Mikhail Yuryevich Lunin (born 31 May 1978) is a Russian professional football coach and a former player.

Club career
He made his debut in the Russian Premier League in 1999 for FC Uralan Elista. He played one game in the UEFA Cup 2000–01 for PFC CSKA Moscow.

References

1978 births
Living people
Russian footballers
FC Dynamo Moscow reserves players
FC Elista players
PFC CSKA Moscow players
FC Fakel Voronezh players
FC Luch Vladivostok players
FC Zhenis Astana players
FC Anzhi Makhachkala players
FC Salyut Belgorod players
FC Chernomorets Novorossiysk players
Russian expatriate footballers
Expatriate footballers in Belgium
Expatriate footballers in Kazakhstan
Russian Premier League players
Russian expatriate sportspeople in Kazakhstan
Association football midfielders
K.R.C. Zuid-West-Vlaanderen players
FC Orenburg players
FC Dynamo Saint Petersburg players
FC Olimp-Dolgoprudny players
FC Sportakademklub Moscow players